Svanøy (also called Svanøyna and Brulandet) is an island in the municipality of Kinn in Vestland county, Norway. The island is located in the Sunnfjord district of the county. The island lies just to the west of the mainland, in the mouth of the Førdefjorden. The Brufjorden runs along the north and east sides of the island and the Stavfjorden runs along the south side of the island. The  island of Svanøy is heavily forested with many hills and small mountains. On Svanøy, there are plants and trees that usually are not found on the west coast of Norway, such as holly. The boat to Florø runs several times every day from Svanøybukt.

History
A stone cross was erected at Brandsøy on the mainland in honor of St. Olaf, and later it was moved to the island. There is a sacrificial place from the Viking Age on the north-east side of the island. The Viking, Eirik Bloodaxe, was allegedly born on the island. The island was historically called Brulandet, and it is now called Svanøy. The name comes from the Bishop Hans Svane who owned the main farm and manor on the island from 1662—1685. Since that time, it has been known as Svanøy (lit. "the island of Svane"), although Brulandet is still one of the official names of the island. Bru Church was located on the island from the 12th century until the 1872, serving the Bru parish (named after the old name for the island). In 1872, the church was torn down and the new Stavang Church was built on the mainland to serve the parish.

See also
List of islands of Norway

References

External links
Visiting Svanøy

Islands of Vestland
Kinn